Manuela Pfrunder (born March 25, 1979, in Lucerne, Switzerland) is a Swiss graphic designer. She was chosen by the Swiss National Bank to design the ninth series of Swiss franc banknotes.

Pfrunder studied graphic design in Lucerne and worked as a designer in New York, Bern and Bath. For her project Die Fortsetzung der Schöpfung (The continuation of Creation), she was awarded the Swiss Design Award in 2001.

In 2005, she submitted designs for the Swiss National Bank's banknote design competition. Her designs, focusing on Switzerland as a tourist destination, were awarded second place. In February 2007, the National Bank chose her submission as the basis of the new banknotes series, which was scheduled to be issued – in a much reworked design – from 2016 through 2018.

References

 Personal website of Manuela Pfrunder

External links
 Designs submitted to the Swiss National Bank for the banknote design competition

Currency designers
Swiss graphic designers
1979 births
Living people